Mohamed Borji (born 30 January 1981) is a former Moroccan football player who last played as a striker for Wydad Casablanca, after joining Pahang FA in Malaysia.

Mohamed Borji featured in the CAF Champions League with FAR Rabat.

References

External links
 Pahang sign two strikers for new season

1981 births
Living people
Moroccan footballers
Footballers from Casablanca
Wydad AC players
Fath Union Sport players
Olympic Club de Safi players
Moroccan expatriate footballers
Expatriate footballers in Tunisia
Moroccan expatriate sportspeople in Tunisia
CS Hammam-Lif players
Difaâ Hassani El Jadidi players
Sri Pahang FC players
Malaysia Super League players
Association football forwards